Estudiantes de La Plata Women is the women's football section of Argentine football club Estudiantes de La Plata, based in the city of La Plata, in Buenos Aires Province. The squad currently plays in the Campeonato de Fútbol Femenino, the first division of Argentine football league system.

The women's football section began as an amateur team of the institution in 1997 when it began to compete, albeit uninterruptedly, in the official tournaments of the Argentine Football Association.

History 
The first match of women's football club as an amateur team for Estudiantes was played in 1997, the season since it has participated continuously in the official tournaments organized by the AFA. The section was founded and promoted in the institution by Lorena Irene Berdula, considered the first women's football coach in Argentina who also founded a school for the development of this discipline.

Before the start of the 2019–20 season, Antonela Guarracino, one of the eight players from the institution who signed a professional contract, became the first player in this section to score a goal in the professional era of AFA women's football.

References

External links
 

Estudiantes de La Plata
Women's football clubs in Argentina
Football clubs in Buenos Aires Province
Association football clubs established in 1905
1905 establishments in Argentina
Sport in La Plata